Kim Byeong-gi (born 13 February 1938) is a South Korean athlete. He competed in the men's discus throw at the 1964 Summer Olympics.

References

1938 births
Living people
Athletes (track and field) at the 1964 Summer Olympics
South Korean male discus throwers
Olympic athletes of South Korea
Place of birth missing (living people)